Gyrophanopsis is a fungal genus  in the family Meruliaceae. Circumscribed by Swiss mycologist Walter Jülich in 1979, the genus contains two species of crust fungi: the type, Gyrophanopsis zealandica, and G. polonensis, added to the genus in 1991.

References

Meruliaceae
Polyporales genera
Taxa named by Walter Jülich
Fungi described in 1979